Haydn Smart (born 26 November 1958) is an Australian cricketer. He played in one first-class match for South Australia in 1987/88.

See also
 List of South Australian representative cricketers

References

External links
 

1958 births
Living people
Australian cricketers
South Australia cricketers
Cricketers from Hobart